John Cecil Robson (24 March 1906–1966) was an English footballer who played in the Football League for Derby County, Hull City, Oldham Athletic, Reading, Rochdale and Southend United.

References

1906 births
1966 deaths
English footballers
Association football forwards
English Football League players
Burnley F.C. players
Birtley Town F.C. players
Hull City A.F.C. players
Reading F.C. players
Derby County F.C. players
Southend United F.C. players
Chester City F.C. players
Rochdale A.F.C. players
Oldham Athletic A.F.C. players